Paperland: The Bureaucrat Observed is a 1979 documentary film critiquing bureaucracy, written and directed by Donald Brittain and produced by the National Film Board of Canada and CBC-TV.

Genie Awards
Paperland: The Bureaucrat Observed won four awards at the 1st Genie Awards and was nominated for two more. This was despite the fact that the NFB did not submit the film to the Academy of Canadian Cinema and Television, with Brittain paying the entry fee and shipping charges himself.

2007 International Documentary Filmfestival Amsterdam
Every year, the IDFA gives an acclaimed filmmaker the chance to screen his or her personal Top 10 favorite films. In 2007, Iranian filmmaker Maziar Bahari selected Paperland: The Bureaucrat Observed for his top ten classics from the history of documentary.

References

External links 
 Watch the film at NFB.ca
 

National Film Board of Canada documentaries
English-language Canadian films
Canadian documentary television films
1979 films
CBC Television original films
Films directed by Donald Brittain
Best Documentary Film Genie and Canadian Screen Award winners
1979 documentary films
Documentary films about politics
Films about bureaucracy
Office work in popular culture
1970s English-language films
1970s Canadian films